Khamti Airport , also known as Hkamti Airport, is an airport serving Khamti (Hkamti), a town in the Khamti (Hkamti) District of the Sagaing Division in northwestern Myanmar.

Facilities
It has one runway which measures . The runway was extended in 2005.

Airlines and destinations

References

External links
 

Hkamti Township
Airports in Myanmar
Sagaing Region